The following railroads operate in the U.S. state of New Hampshire.

Common freight carriers

Green Mountain Railroad (GMRC) (owned by Vermont Railway)
Milford-Bennington Railroad (MBRX)
New England Central Railroad (NECR) (Genesee and Wyoming)
New England Southern Railroad (NEGS)
New Hampshire Central Railroad (NHCR) 
New Hampshire Northcoast Corporation (NHN)
Pan Am Railways (PAR)
Pan Am Southern Railroad (PAS) (operated by Pan Am Railways)
St. Lawrence & Atlantic Railroad (SLR) (Genesee and Wyoming)

Passenger carriers

Amtrak (AMTK)
Conway Scenic Railroad (CSRX)
Hobo Railroad
Mount Washington Cog Railway (MWRC)
Silver Lake Railroad
White Mountain Central Railroad
Wilton Scenic Railroad
Winnipesaukee Scenic Railroad

Defunct railroads

Private carriers
Sawyer River Railroad
Wild River Railroad

Electric
Bay State Street Railway
Berlin Street Railway
Boston and Maine Railroad (Concord and Manchester Electric Branch, Portsmouth Electric Branch)
Boston and Northern Street Railway
Chester and Derry Railroad
Claremont Railway
Claremont Railway and Lighting Company
Claremont Street Railway
Concord Street Railway
Dover, Somersworth and Rochester Street Railway
Exeter, Hampton and Amesbury Street Railway
Exeter Street Railway
Goffs Falls, Litchfield and Hudson Street Railway
Hampton and Amesbury Street Railway
Haverhill, Plaistow and Newton Street Railway
Hudson, Pelham and Salem Street Railway
Keene Electric Railway
Laconia and Lakeport Street Railway
Laconia Street Railway
Manchester and Derry Street Railway
Manchester Street Railway
Manchester and Nashua Street Railway
Manchester Traction, Light and Power Company
Massachusetts Northeastern Street Railway
Nashua Street Railway
Portsmouth and Exeter Street Railway
Rochester Street Railroad
Seabrook and Hampton Beach Street Railway
Springfield Electric Railway
Springfield Terminal Railway (ST)
Union Electric Railway

Not completed
Portland and Rutland Railroad
Portland, Rutland, Oswego and Chicago Railroad

Notes

References
Association of American Railroads (2003), Railroad Service in New Hampshire (PDF). Retrieved May 11, 2005.

New Hampshire
 
 
Railroads